is a manga series written and illustrated by Toriko Chiya. It follows Saya Suzuki, an office lady, who falls in love with her supervisor Susumu Tsuge.

Release
Clover was first serialized in Shueisha's magazine Bouquet between 1997 and 2000. It was transferred to Cookie, being published from 2000 to 2006 on it. In 2006, another Shueisha magazine, Chorus (now Cocohana), began serializing the manga; it lasted until April 2010. All 91 individual chapters were collected by Shueisha into 24 tankōbon volumes, published between July 25, 1997, and January 25, 2011. From November 18, 2008, to August 17, 2012, the series was republished in 13 bunkoban volumes.

The manga, which sold over 9.2 million copies in Japan, has also been published in Italy by Star Comics, in South Korea by Haksan, and in Taiwan by Sharp Point Press. It has spawned a sequel series, which started to be published on June 28, 2012, in Cocohana. Its first tankōbon volume was released on January 25, 2014, and, as of December 25, 2019, ten volumes of Clover Trèfle have been released in Japan. Clover Trèfle was licensed in South Korea by Haksan. Related works  and Green Green Green were released into a single volume on October 17, 2014.

Adaptations
An audio drama CD was published by Shueisha on May 18, 2004.

A film directed by Takeshi Furusawa and written by Taeko Asano was released on November 1, 2014.

References

External links
Clover at Cocohanas site

Clovers film official site 

1997 manga
Josei manga
Romance anime and manga
Sharp Point Press titles
Shueisha franchises
Shueisha manga
Shōjo manga